Great Leader may refer to:

North Korean concept and leaders
Great Leader (concept), the "Great Leader" concept/theory forms the basis on how North Korea is to be ruled
Kim Il-sung, known officially as (The Great Leader) in North Korea
Kim Jong-il, Kim Il-Sung's son
Kim Jong-un, Kim Jong-il's son and Kim Il-sung's grandson

Other people
Mustafa Kemal Atatürk, the Great Leader (Ulu Önder) of the Republic of Turkey
Mammad Amin Rasulzade,  the Great Leader (Ulu Öndər) of the Republic of Azerbaijan
Chairman Mao Zedong of the Chinese Communist Party and the People's Republic of China
Muhammad Ali Jinnah, founder and Governor-General of Pakistan, known as the Great Leader (Quaid-i-Azam) of Pakistan

Arts, entertainment, and media
Great Leader, the primary villain in the Kamen Rider series
The Great Leader, a novel by Jim Harrison